Lieutenant-General Robert Nicholson (1745–1821) was a British military officer on the Bombay establishment, who briefly commanded forces there in 1800.

Military career
Robert Nicholson was the son of Alexander Nicholson and Mary Murray. In about 1763, he joined the military establishment of the Honourable East India Company at Bombay.  He lost his leg at the siege of Barouche in 1772, but continued serving, rising to the Chief Engineer at Bombay and, from 1800, Commanding the troops of the Bombay Army.  He retired to England in 1803.

References

Commanders-in-chief of Bombay
Bombay Presidency
Military personnel of British India
1745 births
1821 deaths